Sheaf may refer to:

 Sheaf (agriculture), a bundle of harvested cereal stems
 Sheaf (mathematics), a mathematical tool
 Sheaf toss, a Scottish sport
 River Sheaf, a tributary of River Don in England
 The Sheaf, a student-run newspaper serving the University of Saskatchewan
 Aluma, a settlement in Israel whose name translates as Sheaf

See also
 Sceafa, a king of English legend 
 Sheath (disambiguation)
 Sheave, a wheel or roller with a groove along its edge for holding a belt, rope or cable